Niphanda is a genus of butterflies in the family Lycaenidae and only member of the Niphandini tribe. The members (species) of this genus are found in the Indomalayan realm and the Palearctic realm. The genus was erected by Frederic Moore in 1875.

Species
Niphanda asialis (de Nicéville, 1895) India to Peninsular Malaya, South Yunnan, Sumatra, Java
Niphanda cymbia de Nicéville, [1884]
Niphanda fusca (Bremer & Grey, 1853) Amur, Ussuri, Transbaikalia, NorthEast China, Japan
Niphanda stubbsi Howarth, 1956 Peninsular Malaya.
Niphanda tessellata Moore, [1875] Burma, Thailand, Malay Peninsula, Sundaland, Philippines 
Niphanda anthenoides Okubo, 2007  Philippines (Mindanao)

References

External links

 Funet Taxonomy Distribution Images
 Images representing Niphanda  at Bold

 
Lycaenidae genera